The 2012–13 English Hockey League season took place from September 2012 until April 2013. The end of season playoffs were held on the 13 & 14 April for the men and the 20 & 21 April for the women. The Men's Championship was won by Beeston and the Women's Championship was won by Reading.

The Men's Cup was won by Surbiton and the Women's Cup was won by Bowdon Hightown.

Men's Premier Division League Standings

Results

Women's Investec Premier Division League Standings

Play Offs

Semi-finals

Finals

Men's Cup

Quarter-finals

Semi-finals

Final
(Held at the Wakefield Hockey Club on 4 May)

Women's Cup

Quarter-finals

Semi-finals

Final
(Held at Beeston Hockey Club on 27 April)

References

England Hockey League seasons
field hockey
field hockey
England